The 1931–32 Washington Huskies men's basketball team represented the University of Washington for the  NCAA college basketball season. Led by twelfth-year head coach Hec Edmundson, the Huskies were members of the Pacific Coast Conference and played their home games on campus at the UW Pavilion in Seattle, Washington.

Washington traveled to Oakland for the PCC championship series against California, the winner of the Southern division after a playoff win over USC. The matchup was a repeat of the previous year's series, won by the Huskies in three games in Seattle. This year, the Golden Bears hosted and won both games to take the conference crown.

The National Invitation Tournament (NIT) debuted in 1938, and the NCAA Tournament in 1939.

Postseason results

|-
!colspan=6 style=| Pacific Coast Conference Playoff Series

References

External links
Sports Reference – Washington Huskies: 1931–32 basketball season
Washington Huskies men's basketball media guide (2009–10) – History

Washington Huskies men's basketball seasons
Washington Huskies
Washington
Washington